Parachromis is a genus of cichlids native to Central America. Some species occur in Lake Nicaragua and Lake Managua. All species are predatory and relatively large for cichlids.

Species
There are currently five recognized species in this genus:

 Parachromis dovii (Günther, 1864) (Wolf cichlid, Guapote)
 Parachromis friedrichsthalii (Heckel, 1840) (Yellowjacket cichlid)
 Parachromis loisellei (W. A. Bussing, 1989) 	 
 Parachromis managuensis (Günther, 1867) (Jaguar cichlid, Jaguar guapote)
 Parachromis motaguensis (Günther, 1867) (False yellowjacket cichlid)

Confusingly, a review in 2018 of the type specimen of P. friedrichsthalii showed that this actually is the species that commonly has been referred to as P. loisellei. As a result, P. loisellei becomes a junior synonym of P. friedrichsthalii, while the yellowjacket cichlid that formerly was incorrectly referred to as P. friedrichsthalii should be referred to as P. multifasciatus.

References 

 
Heroini
Fish of Central America
Taxa named by Louis Agassiz
Cichlid genera